The Passion Translation (TPT) is a modern, dynamic equivalent English translation of the New Testament, and of Genesis, Psalms, Proverbs, Isaiah, and Song of Solomon from the Hebrew Bible. It was first published in 2017 by 5 Fold Media, although the current publisher is Broadstreet Publishing. The lead translator is Brian Simmons.

The translation was written to reflect New Apostolic Reformation beliefs and has been criticized for excessive paraphrasing and the addition of phrases not found in the original manuscripts.

In January 2022 The Passion Translation was removed from Bible Gateway, a popular Bible reading website. The translation still remains available on YouVersion and Logos Bible Software.

History

Simmon’s Vision 
During a television interview in 2015, Brian Simmons claimed that in 2009 Jesus visited his room and commissioned him to write a new translation of the Bible. During the same TV program Simmons claimed that Jesus had revealed to him a new chapter to the Bible, John 22.

Translation and release 
The Passion Translation was primarily the work of one author, Simmons. Although he claims that a team of “respected editors and scholars” reviewed his translations and footnotes, no names were given. For the translation, Simmons claims to have assisted in the Paya-Kuna New Tribes Mission, in which, according to him, he was a translator. Some who worked on the Paya-Kuna translation have stated that Simmons was never a translator. They state he only assisted in reading the translation to the native people, and to provide feedback to the translators of how well the translation was understood by the intended audience. The New Testament was published on October 31st, 2017.

2022 Removal from Bible Gateway 
In January 2022, popular online Bible-reading site Bible Gateway removed TPT from their list of translations. From a screenshot of a deleted Facebook post, Simmons is originally seen to criticize the move, saying: “Cancel culture is alive in the church world” and asking followers to request the site restore the version. Broadstreet Publishing, however, “accepts that Bible Gateway has the right to make decisions as they see fit with the platforms they manage,” they said in a statement.

Criticism 
The Passion Translation has received very mixed reviews. Pastor and politician Bill Johnson praised the translation as “One of the greatest things to happen with Bible translation in my lifetime.” 

However, many pastors and denominations reject the translation. Pastor Andrew Wilson writes: “The Passion ‘translation’ inserts all kinds of concepts, words and ideas of which the original gives no hint whatsoever […] This example comes from the promotional website. In Gal 2:19, hina theō zēsō, which simply means ‘that I might live for God’, has been ‘translated’ as ‘so that I can live for God in heaven’s freedom’ To be clear: there is no indication whatsoever in the Greek of that sentence, or the rest of the chapter, that either heaven or its freedom are in view in this text. It’s not a translation. It’s an interpolation, or a gloss, or (more bluntly) an addition.”

References

Bible versions and translations

External Links

 Official website